Parliamentary elections were held in Chile on 5 March 1961. The Radical Party remained the largest party in the Chamber of Deputies and also became the largest party in the Senate.

Electoral system
The term length for Senators was eight years, with around half of the Senators elected every four years. This election saw 24 of the 45 Senate seats up for election.

Results

Senate

Chamber of Deputies

References

Elections in Chile
Chile
Parliamentary
Chile